A series of vandalizations, arsons, and suspicious fires in June and July 2021 desecrated, damaged, or destroyed 68 Christian churches in Canada. Coincident with fires, vandalism and other destructive events damaged churches in Canada and the United States, primarily in British Columbia. Of these, 25 were the results of fires of all causes. Canadian government officials, church members, and Canadian Indigenous leaders have speculated that the fires and other acts of vandalism have been reactions to the discovery of over 1,000 unmarked graves at Canadian Indian residential school sites.

Church burnings and defacing

On June21, 2021, two Catholic church buildings in British Columbia were destroyed in fires. Sacred Heart Mission Church of Penticton and St. Gregory Mission Church on Osoyoos land were a 40-minute distance from one another. On June26, another two British Columbian Catholic churches–St. Ann's on Chuchuwayha land and Our Lady of Lourdes Catholic Church serving Chopaka–were also destroyed by fires declared "suspicious" by police.  A fire at an Anglican church was also discovered that day, but it was extinguished with minimal damage. On June28, Siksika Nation's Catholic church in Alberta was damaged and the Royal Canadian Mounted Police (RCMP) launched an investigation into its cause. St. Kateri Tekakwitha Church in Indian Brook, Nova Scotia, suffered a fire causing damage to the building on June 30, 2021.

Two fires on the night of July1–2 destroyed a Anglican church on native land and damaged another. The fire that destroyed the abandoned 108-year-old St. Paul's Anglican Church of New Hazelton, British Columbia, was the second suspicious fire at that church in a week; a smaller fire had damaged a door. Authorities worried the flames could spark additional wildfires. The second fire, also in British Columbia, did significant damage to a portion of the St. Columba Anglican Church in Tofino. A RCMP investigation was launched shortly after what police initially determined to be an "incendiary device" was thrown through the window of St. Patrick Co-Cathedral in Yellowknife, resulting in moderate damage. Another Catholic church in Peace River suffered minor damage on July3; the RCMP confirmed the cause was arson.

The Holy Trinity Roman Catholic Church in Redberry Lake burned to the ground on the afternoon of July8; this fire was also called "suspicious" by the RCMP. On July9, the Our Lady of Mercy Roman Catholic Church was destroyed by arson. The church was located in the Kehewin Cree Nation, south of Bonnyville, and was slated for demolition.

After being attacked in an attempted arson on July14, the Coptic Orthodox Church of St. George in Surrey was destroyed by a fire in the early morning hours of July19. No injuries were reported and the RCMP published images of a suspect. One woman was later convicted and sentenced to jail time for the attempted July 14 arson, though from her arrest through her trial, no evidence was presented that connected the attempted arson to the discovery of remains around for residential school sites.

United States
Holy Ghost Catholic Church in Denver, Colorado, was graffitied on June 28 with "1323+..." painted on the building's exterior, which the Catholic News Agency tied to a June 25 report regarding the number of gravesites discovered up to that point. In Portland, Oregon, four Catholic parishes were vandalized in June and July 2021. Among the damaged churches was St. Patrick Catholic Church, which was targeted several times by fires and graffiti bearing anti-colonialist slogans. While some of the vandalism has been tied directly to protests over the gravesites of Indian children at former Catholic-run residential schools, some of the damage has been speculated to be connected with the general rise of vandalism attacks in the Portland area following the COVID-19 pandemic.

Reactions

Condemnation
Chief Greg Gabriel of the Penticton Indian Band expressed "anger" at the fires, stating that any act of arson was "unacceptable." Grand Chief Stewart Philip of the Union of BC Indian Chiefs and Chief Clarence Louie of the Osoyoos Indian Band denounced the fires. Louie declared the fires "a criminal act" and "arson." Grand Chief Arthur Noskey of the Treaty 8 First Nations of Alberta and Loon River First Nation said the churches needed protecting as "potential evidence sites" and that sites of former residential schools need to be protected. Chief Keith Crow of the Lower Similkameen Indian Band (location of the Chopaka church) stated "I'm angry... I don't see any positive coming from this and it's going to be tough."

Alberta Premier Jason Kenney declared on June 30 that the Morinville fire "appears to have been a criminal act of hate inspired violence." On July2, Prime Minister Justin Trudeau called the vandalism and arson attacks targeting Canadian churches "wrong and unacceptable", while later adding that the anger directed towards the church was "fully understandable". 

Former chief Chastity Daniels of the Gitwangak First Nation condemned the July 1 fire at St. Paul's Anglican Church saying "it wasn't a Catholic church, it was an Anglican church and there's nothing but good memories in that church for our community." A group of residential school survivors called for people to stop burning and defacing churches. Jenn Allan-Riley, a Sixties Scoop survivor and daughter of a residential school survivor, stated that "Burning down churches is not in solidarity with us Indigenous people" and "we do not destroy other people's places of worship".

Support for the burnings
Harsha Walia, the executive director of the British Columbia Civil Liberties Association responded to reports of fires at indigenous Catholic parishes with a tweet on June30 that read "burn it all down". Some members of the First Nations community criticized her but the Union of British Columbia Indian Chiefs expressed support for her without mentioning the controversial tweet. She resigned as executive director of the BC Civil Liberties Association over the issue on July 16, 2021.

References 

worship
Anti-Catholicism in the United States
Anti-Christian sentiment in North America
Attacks on churches in North America
Religion and violence
Majority–minority relations
Christian buildings and structures in Canada
2021 crimes in the United States
2021 fires in North America
2021 crimes in Canada
Violence against Christians